The Fortieth Oklahoma Legislature was a meeting of the legislative branch of the government of Oklahoma, composed of the Senate and the House of Representatives. It met in Oklahoma City from January 8, 1985, to January 6, 1987, during the term of Governor George Nigh. It was marked by the enactment of the Executive Branch Reform Act of 1986 and the establishment of the franchise tax in Oklahoma.

Lieutenant Governor Spencer Bernard served as President of the Senate. Rodger Randle served as President pro tempore of the Oklahoma Senate. The Republican Minority leader of the Senate was Timothy D. Leonard. The Speaker of the Oklahoma House of Representatives was Jim Barker. The Republican Minority leader of the House was Frank W. Davis.

Dates of sessions
First regular session: January 8-July 19, 1985
Second regular session: January 7-June 13, 1986
Previous: 39th Legislature • Next: 41st Legislature

Party composition

Senate

House of Representatives

Major legislation

Enacted
The Executive Branch Reform Act of 1986 reorganized the executive branch into agency function categories, stopped short of consolidation of the more than 250 executive branch agencies, boards and commissions. 
The Oklahoma Franchise Tax Code established the franchise tax in Oklahoma.

Leadership
Lieutenant Governor Spencer Bernard served as President of the Senate, presiding over ceremonial session activities. Rodger Randle, of Tulsa, served as President Pro Tempore of the Oklahoma Senate. The Republican Minority leader of the Senate was Timothy D. Leonard.

The Speaker of the Oklahoma House of Representatives was Jim Barker. Lonnie Abbot served as Speaker Pro Tempore. The Republican Minority leader of the House was Frank W. Davis.

Members

Senate

Table based on state almanac.

House of Representatives

Table based on government database of historic members.

References

Oklahoma legislative sessions
1985 in Oklahoma
1986 in Oklahoma
1985 U.S. legislative sessions
1986 U.S. legislative sessions